Silver Mountain (also, Kongsberg, Konigsberg, Köngsberg and Silver Mountain City) is a former settlement in Alpine County, California.

Silver Mountain was founded in 1858 by Norwegian miners who named the place Köngsberg or Konigsberg. Within a year, the town had a population of around 3,000. The Konigsberg post office opened in 1863, closed a while in 1864, was renamed Silver Mountain in 1865, and closed for good in 1883. By 1886, the mines were no longer productive and the town was abandoned.

Silver Mountain was the first county seat of Alpine County, when the County was formed in 1864. The county seat was moved to Markleeville in 1875.

References

External links

Former settlements in Alpine County, California
Former populated places in California
Former county seats in California
Norwegian-American culture in California